J Hutchinson Pty Ltd, trading as Hutchinson Builders, commonly known as Hutchies, is Australia's largest privately owned construction companies.

Hutchinson Builders was founded in Brisbane, Queensland on 29 January 1912, with its first project being the construction of a new kitchen at Fort Lytton for the Queensland State Government.

IBISWorld's Top 500 Private Companies in Australia list ranked by revenue lists Hutchies at #6. They are the largest privately-owned builder in Australia.

See also

References

External links
 

Construction and civil engineering companies established in 1912
Australian companies established in 1912
Construction and civil engineering companies of Australia
Privately held companies of Australia